Relevance is a measure of how pertinent, connected, or applicable something is.

Relevance may also refer to:

Relevance (information retrieval), a measure of a document's applicability to a given subject or search query
Relevance (law), regarding the admissibility of evidence in legal proceedings
Relevance logic, mathematical logic system that imposes certain restrictions on implication
Relevance theory, cognitive theory of communication via interpretive inferences
"Relevance" (Person of Interest), an episode of the American television drama series Person of Interest

See also
 Relevant (disambiguation)